F.C. Nacional is a futsal club based in Zagreb, Croatia. Before 2008 club was known under the name MNK Gospić and it was based in city of Gospić, Croatia.

Honours

National
Croatian Futsal League: 
2006/07, 2007/08, 2009/10,2012/2013
Croatian Futsal Cup: 
2007/08, 2008/09, 2009/10

Current squad

See also
Futsal in Croatia

External links
Official Website
UEFA profile

Futsal clubs in Croatia
Futsal clubs established in 2003
2003 establishments in Croatia
Football clubs in Zagreb